

Background
The Department of Forests and Park Services of Bhutan which was founded in 1952 is responsible to protect, conserve, utilize and manage the forestry resources of Bhutan. It was one of the oldest government departments in Bhutan. During the inception of the Department back in the 1950s, the department has been manned by the foresters from India. This was due to the lack of trained personnel from Bhutan at that time. As of now, the Department is fully manned by the nationals.

History
The Department of Forests and Park Services was established in 1952 under the name "Department of Forests" which was before the starting of the FYPs in the country. In 1961 the Department was under the Ministry of Trade, Industry and Forests.

In the early 1980s, the Department was put under the Ministry of Agriculture during a reorganisation exercise by RCSC based on cadre system.

Forestry policy and Legislation
Bhutanese have always been endowed with rich renewable resources. Majority of the people in Bhutan reside in the rural areas of the country. These section of the country rely heavily on the forest resources for their livelihood. Until the 1960s the people in Bhutan made use of the forest resources in their vicinity without much interferences from the Government.

Vision and mission

Vision
"Sustaining Bhutan’s forest resources & biodiversity for the happiness of present and future generations"

Mission
"To conserve and manage Bhutan’s forest resources & biodiversity to ensure social, economic and environmental well-being, and to maintain a minimum of 60% of the land under forest cover for all times to come"

Functional Divisions
The Department of Forests and Park Services is composed of six functional divisions.

Forest Protection and Enforcement Division (FPED)
The Forest Protection and Enforcement Division, the then Forest Protection & Land Use Section (FPLUS) was formed sometime in 1991 as one of the oldest Functional Divisions under the Department. It was renamed to FPUD in 2000.

The objective of this division is to ensure forest protection, sustainable management & utilization of land & forest resources.

Sections/Programmes
Sections or programmes under this functional division are as follows:

Forest Protection
Functions the under Forest Protection section are;
Forest Litigation-functions
Forest Epidemics-functions and
Anti-Poaching

Forest Utilization
This is the main section under the functional division which ensures to maintain uniform allocation of Natural Resources sustainably throughout the country.

Forest Landuse
This section oversees the appropriate use and allocation of the state reserved forest lands properly in line with the existing Acts, Rules and regulations.

Forest Fire Management
This section oversees the various activities pertaining to the prevention and minimizing of forest fire in the country.

Forest Resource Management Division (FRMD)
The forests resource management division under the DoFPS ensures the sustainable management of forestry resources of Bhutan. Scientific management of Forest is done through the establishment of Forest Management Units. The division was renamed to FRMD in 2000 from Forest Resource Development Division.

Sections
Forest Management Planning Section
Inventory and Data Section
Monitoring and Implementation Support Section
Geographical Information System Section
Forest Demarcation Section

Nature Conservation Division  (NCD)
The Nature Conservation Division under the Department was established in 1992 to plan and implement conservation programs in the country. This division is the sole technical support provider to the protected areas.

Technical Sections under the NCD
Species Conservation and Monitoring Section (SCMS)
Nature Recreation and Ecotourism Section (NRES) 
Protected Area Section (PAS)
Human Wildlife Conflict Management Section (HWCMS)

Social Forestry and Extension Division (SFED)
The Social Forestry and Extension Division under the Department was established in 1989 under the name "Afforestation Division".

Sections under SFED
Social Forestry Section
Plantation Section
NWFP Section

Watershed Management Division (WMD)
This Division was created on 25 May 2009 after the proposal for its creation in January 2009. The primary mandate of this division is to implement the watershed management program.

Sections under the Division
Rangeland farming section
Forest Section
Water and Climate section

Nature Recreation and Eco-tourism Division (NRED)

Sections under the NRED
Survey and Eco-design section
Planning and product development section
Education and communication section

Territorial Divisions
The forests which are outside the jurisdiction of the protected areas are being managed through the 14 territorial forest divisions located at various places in the country. Prior to 2016, there were only 12 territorial forest divisions.

Bumthang Forest Division

Background
Bumthang Forest Division was established in April 1983 at Lamigoenpa in Lamai Goenpa Dzong which currently houses the Ugyen Wangchuck Institute for Conservation and Environment

Prior to the establishment of this territorial forest division, in the 1970s forestry activities in the Bumthang Dzongkhag were carried out by a forestry beat office which was housed in a private house at Joak near Jakar Lhakhang with the headquarter at Sarbang Forest Division. The beat office was under the Trongsa Range then.

Before the creation of Mongar forest division in 1985, this territorial forest division has been looking after Zhemgang, Mongar, Lhuntse, Trongsa and Bumthang Dzongkhags. With the creation of Zhemgang Division on July 28, 2003, this division handed over the Trongsa and Zhemgang Dzongkhags to the Zhemgang Forest Division.

Significance
Besides being one of the busiest territorial forest divisions in the country, the territorial forest division is also a home to some of the very important species of wild flora and fauna.

For instance, the national animal Bhutan Takin, Raven, Blue Poppy and the  Cypress are found in the areas which fall under the jurisdiction of Bumthang Forest Division.

Vegetation
Cool Temperate Forest with mostly Blue Pine forests and other conifers
Sub-alpine
Alpine Scrub

Area Coverage
This territorial forest division spans over an area of less than 67,0652 acres.

Bordering areas
North: International Boundary with China
East: Phromrong ridge (Phrumsengla National Park)
West: Yotongla ridge(Zhemgang Division’s boundary)
South: Zuri Kertsho (Zhemgang Division’s boundary)

Altitude Range
2600m to more than 4000m above sea level

Administration

Divisional Headquarters
The Divisional Headquarters is located at Badthpalathang, about 500 meters away from Chamkhar town.

Forest Range Offices
Bumthang Range
Chumey Range
Trongsa Range

Forest Beat Offices
Tang Beat Office
Tangsibji Beat Office
Nubi Beat Office

Forest Management Units
Dawathang FMU
Karshong FMU 
Chendebji FMU 
Rodungla FMU

Forest Check Posts
Chamkhar Checkpost

Forest Coverage
 66.7%

Sections
Technical Section
Resource Management Section
Conservation and Protection Section
Resource Allotment and Trade Section
Research and Information Management Section

Administrative and Finance Sections
Administrative Section
Finance Section

Gedu Forest Division

Background
In the year 1985, Sub-Divisional Forest Office was opened at Gedu in the old site office of Bhutan Logging Corporation (BLC) and later new Divisional office was constructed and Gedu Territorial Divisional Forest Office was established in the year 1988.

Area Coverage
Gedu Territorial Forest Division covers entire Chukha Dzongkhag (11 Gewogs) and have total area of 1,991 km2 (769 sq mi). Gedu Territorial Forest Division is gateway for import and export of Forestry products and is also the commercial and financial hub of Bhutan.

Range and beat Offices
There are three Range offices (Gedu,Tshimasham and Phuntsholing) and Five beat Offices (Chapcha, Wangkha, Darla, Kungkha and Pasakha Beat Office) under Gedu Territorial Forest Division.

Sections

Technical Section
Coordinate and correspond on behalf of Division.  
Monitoring of Plantation activities of Division and reporting to SFED.
General Patrolling to curb illegal activities.
Maintain records of timber supplied to other Dzongkhag and special allotment made for Dzongs, Lhakhangs, etc.
Update and maintain proper record of timber supplied Dzongkhag wise, Gewog wise and for other purposes.
Prepare and maintain report on the type and number of timber supplied for commercial purpose.
Coordinate, prepare and Renew management Plan for FMU.
Issue clearance for Land/Transmission & Road construction, etc.
Maintaining record of forestry clearance issued for Land allotment ( Kidu, substitute), lease, transmission & telephone lines, Road, etc.
Preparation and submission of quarterly/annual report of Land/Transmission and Roads.
Maintain records of Stone and sand quarry.
Correspondence and maintain records of Wild life and NWFP.
Preparation and Maintaining of Quarterly/Annual report for timber extracted by NRDCL form outside FMU like from transmissions lines, working Schemes, etc. 
Provide back up of important information to the Division as and when required.
Verification of field reports submitted by Range offices.

Social Forestry Section

Administration
Planning and preparation of five year plans and annual plan for the Division.
Maintain and update service records and process promotion and training of staffs.
Maintain record of all fix assets, stores (equipments, furniture) and stationeries including permits books of the Division and Ranges.
Coordinate and correspond on behalf of the Division in both Dzongkha and English
Conduct advertisement/tender/quotation/procurement of store items, etc.  
Process, verify and maintain proper record of rural house building timber, firewood, fencing poles, flag poles, etc.

Accounts Section
Overall financial management of the Division
Timely preparation and submission of monthly accounts to the Department of Public Accounts
Coordinate and monitor the collection and deposit of revenues by Ranges.
Preparation and submission of annual budget timely.
To coordinate tendering and procurement process
Prepare and submit financial report to the data manager.
Provide back up of important information to the Division as and when required.

Data Management Section
Timely preparation and submission of monthly, quarterly, annual and any other reports to the Forest Directorate.
Provide timely and accurate data to Forest Directorate with prior consent of section heads
As a data manager up date and maintain Division’s data base.
Realization of GRF lease rent annually.

Paro Forest Division
The Paro Forest Division is the forest division which caters to the various forestry services to the people of Paro and Haa Dzongkhags.

Sections
Timber & Technical Section
Planning Section
Monitoring Protection Section 
Social Forestry & Wildlife Section

Administration

Forest Range Offices
Haa Forest Range Office
Paro Forest Range Office

Samtse Forest Division

Administration

Samdrup Jongkhar Forest Division

Administration

Tashigang Forest Division

Administration

Sarpang Forest Division

Administration

Zhemgang Forest Division

Administration

Mongar Forest Division
Mongar Forest Division is one of the 14 Territorial Forest Divisions situated in the eastern part of Bhutan. The Division was formally established in 1985.

In the initial phase Trashigang was also under Mongar Division. After establishment of separate Division for Trashigang and Trashiyangtse region, Mongar Division is entrusted with forest management responsibility of 17 geogs in Mongar Dzongkhag and 4 geogs in Lhuntse Dzongkhag and spans over an area of 483,493 ha.

Administration
Forest Range Offices
Mongar Forest Range Office
Lhuntse Forest Range Office
Gyelposhing Forest Range Office
Forest Management Units
Rongmenchu FMU 
Korrila FMU 
Lingmethang FMU

Geographic area
Mongar Forest division covers an area of 483,493ha.

Geographic Location
Latitude= 26°50’ and 28° 10’ N
Longitude= 90° 46’ and 91°10’E

Altitude range
400 to 4000 meters above sea level.

Bordering areas
East= Trashigang Division 
West= Phrumsengla National Park
North= Wangchuck Centennial National Park & Bumdeling Wildlife Sanctuary. 
South=Samdrup Jongkhar Division

Vegetation type
Sub-tropical broadleaved forest
Chirpine forest
Temperate broadleaved forest
Bluepine forest

Wangdue Forest Division
The Wangdue Forest Division was established in 1990 at Lobesa. It is one of the largest divisions in Bhutan at 5030.00 sq km. The Wangdue territorial forest Division is divided into various forest management units.

Administration

Thimphu Forest

Administration

Tsirang Forest Division

Administration

Dagana Forest Division
With its head office at Dagapela, the Dagana Forest Division was established formally on 8 November 2016.

This Forest Division with its two administrative range offices and two beat offices will cater to the services of the people.

Pema Gatshel Forest Division
Pema Gatshel Forest Division was established with its office inaugurated on 17 November 2016.

Administration
Two Range Offices,  Pemagatshel and Nganglam along with three Beat Offices, one each at Dungmaed, Yurung and Nanong, and two Checkposts at Kherogompa and Nganglam will cater to the services of the people.

Protected Areas and Biological Corridors

Protected areas

The IUCN defines a protected area as "an area of land and/or sea especially dedicated to the protection and maintenance of biological diversity, and of natural and associated cultural resources, and managed through legal or other effective means."

The Forest and Nature Conservation Act of Bhutan, 1995 defines a protected area as an area, which has been declared to be a national park, conservation area, wildlife sanctuary, wildlife reserve, nature reserve, strict nature reserve, research forest, critical watershed or other protected areas.

Over the generations, Bhutanese have managed the forest resources in a sustainable manner.  A network of protected areas have been designated by the government to further conserve the environment. Protected areas in Bhutan are in the form of National Parks, Wildlife Sanctuaries, conservation area and Biological corridors. Five national Parks, four wildlife sanctuaries and a strict nature reserve spreads over various places in Bhutan.

The area and coverage percentage of the protected areas according to the Forestry Facts and Figures, 2013 is shown in the table below.

National Parks

Wildlife Sanctuaries

Strict Nature Reserve

Biological corridors
Bhutanese established biological corridors in 1999. During the establishment of the biological corridors in the country, there were 12 corridors covering a total area of  3,660 km2. The biological corridors in Bhutan was declared as a "Gift to the Earth from the people of Bhutan" by Her Majesty Queen Mother Ashi Dorji Wangmo Wangchuck.

Currently, the total area covered by the eight biological corridors is 3,307.14 km2. The corridors have been numbered from 1 to 8 in order to manage them effectively.

Conservation Areas outside the Protected Areas System
The Biodiversity Action Plan, 2002 named a number of areas outside the protected areas system that are of great conservation value and require some special regulations and management interventions to ensure protection from potentially intrusive activities. These areas are multiple use areas which does not need to be under the management of the Wildlife Conservation Division.

Phobjikha Conservation Area

The Phobjikha Valley which lies towards the western side of the Jigme Singye Wangchuck National Park is one of the largest high-altitude wetlands of Bhutan. It is one of the most important wintering habitats for the vulnerable Black-necked Cranes.

Sustainable Forest Management

The developmental activities in Bhutan has been increasing year by year. Developmental works increased and the demand for timber resources equally increased. In order to cater to the ever-increasing commercial demand for timber resources and for the rural purposes, the Department of Forests and Park Services of Bhutan has identified forest areas from where timber are harvested scientifically according to their management plans. The management plans were prepared by the department inline with the Forest Management Code of Bhutan, 2004. Bhutan currently has 23 areas identified as production forests. Currently there are 17 functional Forest Management Units and 6 working schemes.

Production Forests

Community Forests
Majority of the Bhutanese popuplation live in the rural areas where they rely heavily on the forest resources for their basic needs. Forests provide them with products and services in the form of firewood, timber, fodder, foods, medicine, leaf litter, water for drinking and irrigation and some forests are highly revered as home of local deities. These local forest users can be resource managers.

His Majesty King Jigme Singye Wangchuck in 1979 said that "The participation of the local community is the key to conservation and utilisation of forest resources". This led to the starting of community forestry in Bhutan as government supported programme. In 1995, Her Royal Highness Ashi Sonam Chodon Wangchuck stated that "Comminity Forestry builds on existing local knowledge and traditional forest, management systems and develops means to devolve management responsibility for forest areas to the people that actually depend on the forest for their sustenance. "

The Forest and Nature Conservation Act of Bhutan(1995) and the revised Forest and Nature Conservation Rules of Bhutan(2003) provides legal basis for communioty forestry in Bhutan. Chapter IV of the Forest and Nature Conservation Rules of Bhutan (2006)deals with the Community Forestry. Dozam Community Forest was the first Community Forest established by the Department and as of 2013, there were 529 community Forests in Bhutan.

Private Forests

Ugyen Wangchuck Institute for Conservation and Environmental Research

The Ugyen Wangchuck Institute for Conservation and Environmental Research is a government based research training institute under the Department of Forests and Park Services of Bhutan. Currently the institute is housed in the Lamai Gonpa Dzong which was built in 1887 by the first King of Bhutan, His Majesty Ugyen Wangchuck when he was 25 years old.

See also
 List of protected areas of Bhutan
Wildlife in Bhutan
 Black-necked cranes in Bhutan
Forestry in Bhutan
List of Hot Springs and Mineral Springs of Bhutan

External links
Department of Forests and Park Services
Ministry of Agriculture and Forests
Ugyen Wangchuck Institute for Conservation and Environment

References 

Forestry agencies
Government of Bhutan